Death...The Brutal Way is the seventh album by Asphyx. It was released in June 2009 in Europe by Century Media Records. and in the US by Ibex Moon. A limited edition of 1000 copies contains a bonus DVD featuring the band's reunion show from the 2007 Party.San Open Air festival in Bad Berka, Germany.
It was their first album in nine years since their 2000 album, On the Wings of Inferno.

Track listing
All songs written and arranged by Asphyx.

Personnel
Asphyx
Martin van Drunen - lead vocals
Paul Baayens - guitar
Bob Bagchus - drums
Wannes Gubbels - bass guitar, backing vocals

Production
Frank Klein Douwel - engineering, recording
Dan Swanö - mastering, mixing
Mick Koopman - artwork
Mira Born - photography

References

Asphyx albums
2009 albums
Century Media Records albums